Past, Present, Future or Past, Present and Future may refer to:

Books
 Islam: Past, Present and Future, a book by Hans Küng
 Past, Present and Future, a book series by Nat Schachner
 Past, Present and Future (1987), a book by Isaac Asimov

Music

Albums
 Past, Present, Future (Morgana Lefay album), 1995
 Past, Present, Future (Tiki Taane album), 2007
 Past:Present:Future (Chipz EPs), 2006, two-part extended play series
 Past, Present and Future (Al Stewart album), 1973
 Past, Present & Future (Rob Zombie album), 2003
 Past, Present, & Future, an album by Aron Burton
 Trilogy: Past Present Future, by Frank Sinatra, 1980
 Trinity (Past, Present and Future), by Slum Village, 2002
 HIStory: Past, Present and Future, Book I, by Michael Jackson, 1995
 Pa La Calle: Pasado, Presente y Futuro, a 2010 mixtape by Zion & Lennox
 The Past, The Present, The Future (Mark 'Oh album), 2009
 Past Present Future, by Manu Dibango, 2011
 The Past, The Present, The Future (Jodeci album), 2015
 Past, Present & Future, by John Lipari, 2019
 Past // Present // Future, by Meet Me at the Altar, 2023

Songs
 "Past, Present, and Future", a song by Abby Travis
 "Past, Present and Future", a song by Agnetha Fältskog from My Colouring Book
 "Past, Present and Future", a song by Allen Kwela
 "Past, Present, & Future", a song by Aron Burton
 "Past, Present and Future", a song by Grant Green from The Final Comedown
 "Past Present and Future", a song by Marianne Faithfull from Horses and High Heels
 "Past Present and Future", a song by Ronnie Self
 "Past, Present and Future", a song by The Shangri-Las
 "Past Present and Future", a song by Sibongile Khumalo
 "My Past, My Present and My Future", a song by Russ Columbo
 "Sound Image of the Past, Present and Future", a song by Muhal Richard Abrams from Family Talk
 "Visions of the Past, Present and Future", a song by White Hills
 "You're My Past, Present, and Future", a song by Joe Venuti

Television
 "Past, Present, and Future" (NCIS), a 2013 episode
 "Lost: Past, Present & Future", a season 4 clip-show recapping the first three seasons of the television series Lost

See also
 Grammatical tense
 "The Past, Present and Future", a 63-minute recording by Thích Nhất Hạnh
 Ghost of Christmas Past, Ghost of Christmas Present and Ghost of Christmas Future, fictional characters in English novel A Christmas Carol, by Charles Dickens
Time